Marc A. Kastner (born November 20, 1945) is an American physicist and Donner Professor of Science and the former Dean of the School of Science at the Massachusetts Institute of Technology. Currently he is President of the Science Philanthropy Alliance.

Early years 
Kastner was born in Toronto, Ontario, on November 20, 1945. He completed his B.S. in Chemistry in 1967, M.S. in 1969 and Ph.D. in Physics in 1972 from the University of Chicago.

Academic career 
Kastner was a Harvard Research Fellow from 1972 to 1973. He joined the faculty of the Massachusetts Institute of Technology in 1973. He became Donner Professor of Science at MIT in 1989. He was appointed Department Head in February 1998. He served as the Dean of the School of Science at MIT from 2007 to 2013.

Research 
Kastner was a researcher on amorphous semiconductors. His early research focused on the relationship between chemical bonding and the electronic structure of defects in glasses.

In 1990, his group at MIT discovered the single-electron transistor. It is a device in which electrostatic fields confine electrons to a small region of space inside a semiconductor. Single-electron transistors turn on and off again every time one electron is added. In an interview, he said that the discovery that a transistor could turn on and off again every time an electron was added to it was one of the most astounding and exciting experiences of his life.

His recent research focused on the electronic properties of nanometer-size semiconductor structures and on the physics of high temperature (Tc ) superconductivity.

Awards
Kastner received the 1995 David Adler Lectureship Award from the American Physical Society for his research on semiconductors.

References

External links 
 CV of Marc A. Kastner
 Interview with the dean: Marc Kastner, MIT School of Science
 Kastner of physics is new dean of science
 Marc A. Kastner at MIT

1945 births
Living people
Scientists from Toronto
21st-century American physicists
Harvard Fellows
Massachusetts Institute of Technology School of Science faculty
Oliver E. Buckley Condensed Matter Prize winners
University of Chicago alumni
Fellows of the American Physical Society